Dražen Bubnič (born January 13, 1986) is a Croatian-Slovenian professional basketball player who plays for KK Šenčur. He is a 2.05 m (6 ft 9 in) tall forward.

Professional career
On July 30, 2012, Bubnič signed one-year deal with Union Olimpija.

On November 24, 2015, Bubnič signed for the remainder of the 2015–16 season with Donar Groningen, where he replaced Garrick Sherman. With Donar, Bubnič won the DBL championship.

On August 23, 2016, Bubnič returned to Union Olimpija.

References

External links
 Eurobasket.com Profile
 FIBA.com Profile

1986 births
Living people
Basketball players from Rijeka
Croatian men's basketball players
Slovenian expatriate basketball people in the Netherlands
KK Olimpija players
Donar (basketball club) players
Dutch Basketball League players
Power forwards (basketball)
Slovenian men's basketball players
Small forwards
Croatian expatriate basketball people in the Netherlands
Helios Suns players
Slovenian expatriate basketball people in Romania
Croatian expatriate basketball people in Romania